Freddrenna Margaret Lyle serves as Judge of the First Municipal District of State of Illinois' Circuit Court of Cook County. Appointed on December 16, 2011 by all seven Illinois Supreme Court Justices. She served as alderman of the 6th Ward of the City of Chicago for 13 years.

Early history
Lyle has lived in the Park Manor, Chicago neighborhood for more than 45 years. She attended Park Manor Elementary School and South Shore High School. She earned her undergraduate degree from the University of Illinois at Chicago and her law degree from John Marshall Law School. Before her appointment, Lyle was an attorney in private practice.

Public service
Lyle was President of the Cook County Bar Association, board member of the National Bar Association, member of the Supreme Court Committee on Character and Fitness, and co-chair of the Lawyer’s Committee for Harold Washington. She also served on Governor Blagojevich’s transition team. She is currently a member of Park Manor Neighbors, Chatham Avalon Park Community Council, NAACP, and Rainbow/PUSH. She is currently the Vice Chair of the Cook County Democratic Party and Chairman of the Black Elected Officials of Illinois.

Aldermanic career

Lyle was appointed alderman by Chicago Mayor Richard M. Daley on February 8, 1998 to fill the unexpired term of John O. Steele. She was reelected for a full term in 1999, 2003 and 2007 and also elected as the Democratic committeeman in 2006. Lyle served on five committees: Budget; Finance; Parks and Recreation; License and Consumer Protection; Traffic and Public Safety; and Rules and Ethics.

Judgeship
After her defeat, she served as a legal advisor to the Council's Black Caucus regarding the redistricting process for Chicago's 50 wards. Later that year, the Illinois Supreme Court appointed Lyle to a vacancy on the Circuit Court of Cook County created by retirement of Judge Michael Stuttley.

Personal life
Lyle continues to reside in Park Manor.

References

External links
Freddrenna Lyle's official campaign website

Chicago City Council members
University of Illinois Chicago alumni
African-American women in politics
Living people
Illinois Democrats
Women city councillors in Illinois
Year of birth missing (living people)
Judges of the Circuit Court of Cook County
African-American city council members in Illinois
21st-century African-American people
21st-century African-American women